Colaspis brownsvillensis, the Brownsville milkvine leaf beetle, is a species of leaf beetle found in the state of Texas in the United States. It was first described by the American entomologist Doris Holmes Blake in 1976 from Brownsville, Texas, after which the species is named. It is a close relative of Colaspis nigrocyanea.

References

Further reading

 

Eumolpinae
Articles created by Qbugbot
Taxa named by Doris Holmes Blake
Beetles described in 1976
Beetles of the United States